Sembanarkoil (formerly Semponnarkoil) is a panchayat town in Tranquebar taluk in Mayiladuthurai district in the Indian state of Tamil Nadu. The town is located in the historic Thanjavur area on the banks of the river Cauvery. Its history is centered around Swarnapureeswarar Temple.

Geography 
Sembanarkoil lies on the shores of Bay of Bengal, comprising a coastal plain with a few sand dunes. The Cauvery and its offshoots are the principal rivers.

Sembanarkoil is near 6. Keezhaiyur, the biggest panjayat through Mayiladuturai.

Climate

Temperature
The average maximum temperature for the district (from 1991 to 1996) as a whole is about 32 C and the average minimum temperature is 24 C.

Wind
Dust storms, whirlwinds and dusty winds blow from various quarters towards the end of May. The southwest wind sets in during April. It is strongest in June and continues till September. Cyclones with varying wind velocity arrive every three or four years during November–December. The Northeast monsoon is accompanied by winds that can affect crops, but during Southwest monsoon the air is calm and undisturbed.

Rainfall
The Northeast monsoon, which starts in October and ends in December, contributes about 60% of the total annual rainfall. The Southwest monsoon rains from June to September and from March to May account equally for the rest.

Demographics 
The village is made up of 2079 males and 2121 females.

Transport 
Sembanarkoil can be reached by main-line trains and road. From Chennai, it can be reached through the East Coast Road via Puducherry. The nearest railhead is Mayiladuthurai Junction, which hosts direct trains to Chennai, Bangalore, Mysore, Thirupathi, Bombay, Varanasi, Rameswaram, and Coimbatore. 

Bus service to nearby towns such as Mayiladuthurai, Thirukadaiyur, Porayar/Tharangambadi and Mayiladuthurai is frequent.

Economy
Agriculture is the main activity, as this is a fertile land. Rice, cotton, black gram, Bengal gram, coconut, banana, and sugarcane are the main products. Because of its location, it has become an important trading and commercial center for nearby villages.

Education
Kalaimahal College of Education, Sembanarkoil

References

http://holyindia.org/shiva/thevaram_temple/0105_thiruchemponpalli_sembanarkoil_swarnapureesar.jsp

Cities and towns in Mayiladuthurai district